O23 or O-23 may refer to:
 , a submarine of the Royal Netherlands Navy 
 Osim International, a Singaporean company
 Oxygen-23, an isotope of oxygen
 Ranchaero Airport, in Butte County, California, United States; assigned FAA LID O23 until 2009
 Thomas-Morse O-23, an observation aircraft of the United States Army Air Corps